Michael Duncan Clark CBE (born 29 May 1962) is a Scottish dancer and choreographer.

Early life
Clark was born in Aberdeen and began traditional Scottish dancing at the age of four. In 1975 he left home to study at the Royal Ballet School in London, and on his final day at the school he was presented with the Ursula Moreton Choreographic Award. In 1979 Clark joined Ballet Rambert, working primarily with Richard Alston, who created roles for him in Bell High (1979), Landscape (1980), Rainbow Ripples (1981) and, subsequently, two solos: Soda Lake (1981) and Dutiful Ducks (1982). Later, attending a summer school with Merce Cunningham and John Cage led him to work with Karole Armitage, through whom he met Charles Atlas.

Michael Clark has collaborated with fashion designers Alexander McQueen for his S/S04 Deliverance collection, BodyMap, artists Sarah Lucas and Peter Doig, performance artist Leigh Bowery, and musicians Wire, Laibach, The Fall, Jarvis Cocker and Scritti Politti.

Career
Clark's commissions for major dance companies include the G.R.C.O.P. (Groupe de Recherche Chorégraphique de l'Opéra de Paris), The Paris Opera, Scottish Ballet, London Festival Ballet, Ballet Rambert, Phoenix Dance Company and the Deutsche Oper Berlin. Clark has also produced considerable work for film and video, including Hail the New Puritan (1984) and Because We Must (1989) with Charles Atlas. He also choreographed and danced the role of Caliban in Peter Greenaway's Prospero’s Books (1991).

In 1998 he presented a new full-length work, current/SEE, in collaboration with Susan Stenger, Simon Pearson, Big Bottom, and Hussein Chalayan which became the subject of a BBC documentary directed by Sophie Fiennes, The Late Michael Clark. Before and After: The Fall (2001) was Clark's first major collaboration with the visual artist Sarah Lucas, followed by an evening entitled Would, Should, Can, Did (2003), for the Barbican, London. In the same year Clark created the first Satie Stud for William Trevitt of George Piper Dances, choreographed a solo for Mikhail Baryshnikov, and OH MY GODDESS opened London Dance Umbrella's 25th anniversary season. In 2004 Rambert Dance Company revived SWAMP (1986), which received the Olivier Award for Best New Dance Production in 2005.

In 2005 Clark embarked on the Stravinsky Project, a three-year project to produce a trilogy of works to seminal dance scores by Igor Stravinsky. He radically reworked Mmm... (1992) and 0 (1994), for this project, and in 2007 he premiered the final part of the trilogy, I Do. In 2009 he debuted come, been and gone at the Venice Biennale. Subsequent productions include New Work (2012) (later "animal / vegetable / mineral") and his most recent work "to a simple, rock 'n' roll . . . song." which premiered at the Barbican in London in October 2016. He has created major site-specific commissions for the Tate Modern, Whitney Biennial, the 2012 Cultural Olympiad at Glasgow's Barrowland Ballroom, and The Institute of Contemporary Art (Miami).

Clark was appointed Commander of the Order of the British Empire (CBE) in the 2014 Birthday Honours for services to dance.

Productions

Filmography

Awards

References

External links
Michael Clark Company website

Michael Clark's monograph on Violette Editions

Scottish male dancers
Scottish choreographers
People educated at the Royal Ballet School
1962 births
Living people
LGBT dancers
LGBT choreographers
Scottish LGBT entertainers
People from Aberdeen
Commanders of the Order of the British Empire